

Episodes

References

External links 
 

2018 American television series debuts
2018 American television series endings
2010s American drama television series
Television series based on singers and musicians
Cultural depictions of Selena